Netherthird is a small village in East Ayrshire, Scotland. It features a primary school, two small grocery shops, small restaurants, and a community center. The area of Netherthird, together with the area of Skerrington, forms the southernmost portion of Cumnock, the next closest town in the vicinity.

References

External links
East Ayrshire Council
Netherthird Primary School

Villages in East Ayrshire
Cumnock